The  was a metro electric multiple unit (EMU) train formerly operated by the Tokyo subway operator Tokyo Metro on the Tokyo Metro Chiyoda Line in Tokyo, Japan, from 1993 until 2015.

Operations

Formation
The sole 06 series set, numbered set 71, was based at Ayase Depot and was formed as shown below with four motored ("M") cars and six non-powered trailer ("T") cars, and car 1 at the Yoyogi-Uehara (southern) end.

Cars 2, 4, 7, and 9 each had one lozenge-type pantograph. Car 4 was designated as a mildly air-conditioned car.

Interior
Passenger accommodation consisted of longitudinal seating throughout. Cars 2 and 9 had wheelchair spaces.

History

Built by Kawasaki Heavy Industries, the single ten-car set was delivered in December 1992, and entered service in March 1993. From January 2015, the set was removed from regular service. It was moved to Shinkiba Depot in August 2015, where cutting up commenced in September of the same year.

Gallery

References

External links

  

Electric multiple units of Japan
06 series
Train-related introductions in 1993
1500 V DC multiple units of Japan
Kawasaki multiple units